Ramez Harb (died 19 November 2012) was a Palestinian militant and commander. He was the second high commander killed in the Israeli offensive in the mid-November 2012.

Militant activities and death
Harb was in charge with propaganda in Islamic Jihad's Gaza City Brigade and an aide to Tissir Jabari. He was killed in an Israel Air Force strike on a high-rise building in Gaza City on 19 November 2012 during the Operation Pillar of Cloud.

References

Palestinian militants
2012 deaths
Year of birth missing